is a Japanese animator, storyboard artist, screenwriter, and director from Tokyo.

Works

Anime television
Popolocrois Monogatari (1998–99) – Assistant Director, Episode Director
Arc the Lad (1999) – Director
Wild Arms: Twilight Venom (1999–2000) – Series Director, Storyboard
Love Hina (2000) – Storyboard
Noir (2001) – Storyboard, Episode director
Chitchana Yukitsukai Sugar (2001–02) – Storyboard, Episode director
Shaman King (2001–02) – Storyboard
Ghost in the Shell: Stand Alone Complex (2002–03) – Storyboard
Kiddy Grade (2002–03) – Storyboard
L/R: Licensed by Royalty (2003) – Director
Ghost in the Shell: S.A.C. 2nd GIG (2004–05) – Storyboard
Kaiketsu Zorori (2004–05) – Storyboard
Canvas 2: Niji Iro no Sketch (2005–06) – Director
Mamoru-kun ni Megami no Shukufuku o! (2006) – Director
Nanatsuiro Drops (2007) – Storyboard
Rental Magica (2007–08) – Director, Storyboard
White Album (2009) – Storyboard
Chrome Shelled Regios (2009) – Director
Sengoku Basara: Samurai Kings (2009) – Director, Storyboard
Umi Monogatari (2009) – Episode Director
The Legend of the Legendary Heroes (2010) – Director
Listen to Me, Girls. I Am Your Father! (2012) – Director
Shining Hearts: Shiawase no Pan (2012) – Director, Writer
Lady Jewelpet (2014) – Director
Samurai Jam -Bakumatsu Rock- (2014) – Director
Tsukiuta. THE ANIMATION (2016) – Director, Writer
Magical Girl Ore (2018) – Director, Writer
The Morose Mononokean II (2019) – Director
True Cooking Master Boy (2019–21) – Director, Writer
The Yakuza's Guide to Babysitting (2022) – Director
Flaglia (2023) – Director

Original video animation
Video Girl Ai (1992) – Animation Director
Mega Man: Upon a Star (1993) – Director
Please Save My Earth (1993–94) – Assistant Director
Bronze: Zetsuai Since 1989 (1994) – Director
Dimensional Adventure Numa Monjar (1996) – Director
Chrono Trigger: Time and Space (1996) – Director
Canvas ~Motif of Sepia~ (2001–02) – Director
I'll/CKBC (2002) – Director
Love Hina Again (2002) – Storyboard
Pokémon Origins (2013) – Director
Star Fox Zero: The Battle Begins (2016) - Assistant Director

Original net animation
B: The Beginning Succession (2021) – Director

Film
Tsubasa Reservoir Chronicle the Movie: The Princess in the Birdcage Kingdom (2005) – Director

Video Games
Sonic Riders – Opening cinematic director and storyboard artist.

References

External links

 Itsuro Kawasaki anime at Media Arts Database 

Anime directors
Living people
Japanese storyboard artists
Japanese television writers
Japanese animators
Male television writers
Japanese television directors
Japanese film directors
Japanese television producers
Japanese film producers
Japanese voice directors
Year of birth missing (living people)